Parshall–Hankins Airport  is a public use airport located one nautical mile (1.85 km) south of the central business district of Parshall, a city in Mountrail County, North Dakota, United States. It is owned by the Parshall Airport Authority. Parshall is located on the Fort Berthold Indian Reservation, home to the Mandan, Hidatsa, and Arikara Nation. According to the FAA's National Plan of Integrated Airport Systems for 2009–2013, it is categorized as a general aviation facility.

Facilities and aircraft 
It has one runway designated 12/30 with an asphalt surface measuring 3,200 by 60 feet (975 x 18 m).

For the 12-month period ending December 31, 2007, the airport had 1,260 aircraft operations, an average of 105 per month: 95% general aviation, 4% air taxi, and 1% military. At that time there were 9 aircraft based at this airport, all single-engine.

References

External links 
 Aerial image as of July 1995 from USGS The National Map
 

Airports in North Dakota
Buildings and structures in Mountrail County, North Dakota
Transportation in Mountrail County, North Dakota
Mandan, Hidatsa, and Arikara Nation